The 2002 Tipperary Senior Hurling Championship was the 112th staging of the Tipperary Senior Hurling Championship since its establishment by the Tipperary County Board in 1887. The championship began on 14 September 2002 and ended on 10 November 2002.

Toomevara were the defending champions, however, they were defeated by Mullinahone at the semi-final stage.

On 10 November 2002, Mullinahone won the title after a 2-10 to 1-11 defeat of Thurles Sarsfields in a final replay at Semple Stadium. It remains their only championship title.

Eoin Kelly, Pat Croke, Johnny Enright and Ger O'Grady were the championship's top scorers.

Format change

The number of participating teams increased from eight to sixteen as all participants in the four divisional semi-finals qualified. Divisional teams entered the county championship at different stages. In round one the eight beaten divisional semi-finalists played off to produce four teams. In round two these four teams played the defeated divisional finalists. The four winners played the four divisional winners in the quarter-finals, from which followed the semis and final.

Relegation was also introduced for the first time. Any team that didn't reach the semi-final stage in the respective divisional championships faced the prospect of relegation from senior to intermediate.

Results

First round

Second round

Quarter-finals

Semi-finals

Finals

Championship statistics

Top scorers

Overall

In a single game

Miscellaneous
 Mullinahone win the title for the first time.
 Cashel King Cormacs and Roscrea met in the championship for the first time since 1981.

External links

 County Senior Hurling Championship 2002

References

Tipperary Senior Hurling Championship
Tipperary